The 1982 Central and Western District Board election was the first election held on 23 September 1982 to elect all 5 elected to the 17-member Central and Western District Board.

Overall election results

Results by constituency

Chung Wan

Kennedy Town & Mount Davis

Middle Levels & Peak

Sai Ying Pun

Sheung Wan

See also
 1982 Hong Kong local elections

References

1982 Hong Kong local elections
Central and Western District Council elections